F57 may refer to:

F57 (classification), disability sport classification for disability athletics for people who compete in field events from a seated position
HMAS Queenborough (F57), Q-class destroyer that served in the Royal Navy (RN) and Royal Australian Navy (RAN)
HMS Andromeda (F57), Leander-class frigate of the Royal Navy
The Blue Whale Challenge is occasionally referred to as F57.  Participants were told to carve ‘F57’ into their wrists to complete one of many self-destructive challenges.